Babauta is a surname. Notable people with the surname include:
 Juan Babauta (born 1953), Northern Mariana Islands politician
 Leo Babauta (born 1973), blogger from Guam, of Zen Habits blog
Sheila Babauta (born 1989 or 1990), Northern Mariana Islands politician

Surnames of Oceanian origin